Harry Pennington (20 August 1902 in Leigh, Lancashire – 11 April 1995 in Leigh, Lancashire) was a British wrestler in the 1920s as he became the British champion of Catch Wrestling in 1926. He also taught Joe Reid who also went on to become a British Champion.

References

https://web.archive.org/web/20070204002806/http://www.britishwrestling.org/plibrary/seniordb/BSC1904_2001.pdf
http://archive.lancashireeveningtelegraph.co.uk/2006/8/24/924190.html

Sportspeople from Leigh, Greater Manchester
1902 births
1995 deaths
English male wrestlers